The Old Church Cemetery (also known as Cobh Cemetery) is an ancient cemetery on the outskirts of the town of Cobh, County Cork, Ireland which contains a significant number of important burials, including a number 3 mass graves and several individual graves containing the remains of 193 victims of the passenger ship  which was sunk by a German torpedo off the Old Head of Kinsale during the First World War in May 1915 with the loss of more than 1,100 lives. The Commonwealth War Graves Commission register and maintain the graves of 127 identified Commonwealth service personnel (including Lusitania victims) from the same war.

Notable burials

 Captain Thomas Brierley, awarded a medal for his part in rescue of survivors from RMS Lusitania
 Jack Doyle (1913–1978), boxer, singer and actor
 Robert Forde (1875–1959), Antarctic explorer
 Charles Hallahan (1943–1997), American actor
 Frederick Daniel Parslow (1856–1915), posthumous recipient of the Victoria Cross and first member of British Mercantile Marine to receive the award
 Charles Wolfe (1791–1823), poet, remembered for "The Burial of Sir John Moore at Corunna"
 Louis Piatt (1876–1884), son of American poets John James Piatt and Sarah Morgan Bryan Piatt; drowned in a boating accident in Cork Harbor
 Dr James Roche Verling (1787–1858), personal physician to Napoleon Bonaparte during his exile on St. Helena
 Six members of the crew of the British submarine  which was destroyed in an accidental explosion at nearby Haulbowline Naval Base in February 1905

References

External links
 

Cemeteries in the Republic of Ireland
Monuments and memorials in the Republic of Ireland
Religion in County Cork